The Palestinian National Council (PNC) ("'Almajlis Alwataniu Alfilastiniu"') is the legislative body of the Palestine Liberation Organization (PLO) and elects the PLO Executive Committee, which assumes leadership of the organization between its sessions. The PNC is responsible for formulating the policies and programs for the PLO. It serves as the parliament that represents all Palestinians inside and outside the Palestinian territories, and all sectors of the worldwide Palestinian community, including political parties, popular organizations, resistance movements, and independent figures from all sectors of life.

The Council formally meets every two years. Resolutions are passed by a simple majority with a quorum of two-thirds. The PNC elects its own Chairman.

Structure 
Candidates for the PNC are nominated by a committee consisting of the PLO Executive Committee, the PNC chairman, and the commander in chief of the Palestine Liberation Army. After nomination, PNC candidates are elected by a majority of the entire PNC membership. However, due to the impossibility of holding elections, PNC elections have never been held and most members are appointed by the executive committee.

In 1996, when the Council had to vote on the revision of the Palestinian National Charter, the total number of PNC members was increased from 400 to about 800. By 2009, some 700 from them had remained. , the PNC chairman was Salim Zanoun and the PNC had 669 members; 88 are from the first Palestinian Legislative Council (PLC), 98 represent the Palestinian population living in the West Bank and Gaza Strip, and 483 represent the Palestinian diaspora. While the PNC has a number of PLC members, it is not an organ of the Palestinian Authority. Rather it is the equivalent of PA's PLC.

As of 2012 the main office of the PNC is in Amman and a branch office is located in Ramallah.

History 
The first PNC, composed of 422 representatives, met in Jerusalem in May 1964 and adopted the Palestinian National Covenant (also called Palestinian National Charter). It also established the PLO as the political expression of the Palestinian people and elected Ahmad Al-Shuqeiry as the first chairman of the PLO Executive Committee. At the conference were representatives from Palestinian communities in Jordan, West Bank, the Gaza strip, Syria, Lebanon, Kuwait, Iraq, Egypt, Qatar, Libya, and Algeria.

Subsequent sessions were held in Cairo (1965), Gaza (1966), Cairo (1968–1977), Damascus (1979–1981), Algiers (1983), Amman (1984), Algiers (1988), Gaza (1996 and 1998), Ramallah (2009).

At the February 1969 meeting in Cairo, Yasser Arafat was appointed leader of the PLO. He continued to be PLO leader (sometimes called Chairman, sometimes President) until his death in 2004.

In a November 1988 meeting in Algiers, the PNC approved the Palestinian Declaration of Independence by a vote of 253 in favour 46 against and 10 abstentions.

After the signing of the Oslo Accords in 1993, the PNC met in Gaza in April 1996 and voted 504 to 54 to void those parts of the Palestinian National Covenant that denied Israel's right to exist, but the charter itself has not been formally changed or re-drafted. One of its most prominent members, the Palestinian-American scholar and activist Edward Said, left the PNC because he believed that the Oslo Accords sold short the right of Palestinian refugees to return to their homes in pre-1967 Israel and would not lead to a lasting peace.

In December 1998, the PNC met in Gaza at the insistence of the Israeli Prime Minister Benjamin Netanyahu, who called it a condition of the continuation of the peace process.  In the presence of the US President Clinton, it reaffirmed again the annulling of the parts of the Covenant which denied Israel's right to exist, but it still did not formally change or re-draft the Covenant.  Clinton gave a speech to the event appealing to the PNC not to allow their grievances against Israel to stifle Palestinian progress.

For the first time in 22 years, since its last full meeting in 1996, the 700 member PNC met on 30 April 2018 in Ramallah to discuss recent developments, but many groups did not attend, including Hamas (the leading Palestinian political party), Islamic Jihad and Popular Front for the Liberation of Palestine. The PNC also filled vacancies in the PLO Executive Committee with  loyalists to Palestinian president Mahmood Abbas.

See also
 Palestinian Central Council
 State of Palestine
 Palestinian Declaration of Independence

External links
 Official website

References

Palestine Liberation Organization